"Joke (I'm Laughing)" is a song by Scottish singer-songwriter Eddi Reader, which was released in 1994 as the second single from her second studio album Eddi Reader. It was written by Boo Hewerdine and produced by Greg Penny. "Joke (I'm Laughing)" reached No. 42 on the UK Singles Chart and remained in the Top 100 for three weeks.

In 1996, Hewerdine released his own version of the song as a single from his album Baptist Hospital. Speaking to Folk Radio in 2014, Hewerdine said of the song: ""Joke" was the first song I made up that I thought was good. I wrote it for my post-school band Placebo Thing."

Critical reception
In a review of Eddi Reader, Ira Robbins of Trouser Press described the song as "sardonic" which "seethes with quiet disdain". Jon Pareles of The New York Times observed that "love doesn't go smoothly in Ms. Reader's songs" and noted "Joke (I'm Laughing)" for its narrative of a "spurned woman".

Track listing
7" and cassette single
"Joke (I'm Laughing)" - 3:52
"Saturday Night" - 4:58

CD single
"Joke (I'm Laughing)" - 3:52
"Saturday Night" - 4:58
"Wonderboy" - 2:39

CD single (UK limited edition)
"Joke (I'm Laughing)" - 3:52
"Three Crosses" - 4:16
"Go and Sit Upon the Grass" - 1:27

Personnel
Joke (I'm Laughing)
 Eddi Reader – vocals, backing vocals
 Dean Parks – guitar
 Teddy Borowecki – piano, keyboards
 David Piltch – bass
 Greg Penny – drums

Production
 Greg Penny – producer of "Joke (I'm Laughing)" and "Wonderboy"
 Jon Ingoldsby – mixing and recording on "Joke (I'm Laughing)"
 Andy Strange, Steve Holroyd – assistant engineers on "Joke (I'm Laughing)"
 Ron Johnson – technical assistance on "Joke (I'm Laughing)"
 Chris Bellman – mastering on "Joke (I'm Laughing)"
 Eddi Reader, Teddy Borowiecki – producers of "Saturday Night", "Three Crosses" and "Go and Sit Upon the Grass"

Other
 Kevin Westenberg – photography
 M at Maitland – sleeve design

Charts

References

1994 songs
1994 singles
Blanco y Negro Records singles